Çine Madranspor is a football club located in Aydın, Turkey. The team competes in the Regional Amateur League. The club was promoted to the TFF Third League after 2013–14 season.

League participations 

TFF Second League: 1984–1987
TFF Third League: 2014–present
Turkish Regional Amateur League: 2010–2014

Stadium 
Currently the team plays at the 15,000 capacity Yüksel Yalova Stadium.

Current squad

.

References

External links 
Çine Madranspor on TFF.org

TFF Third League clubs
Football clubs in Turkey